Maryna Er Gorbach (born 1981, Kyiv) is a Ukrainian filmmaker who writes, directs, produces, and edits films, often with her husband, Turkish filmmaker Mehmet Bahadir Er. She won the directing award in the World Cinema Dramatic Competition at the 2022 Sundance Film Festival for her film Klondike. She was among a group of Ukrainian filmmakers who called for international aid for Ukraine in the 2022 Russian invasion of Ukraine.

Maryna Er Gorbach has been a member of the European Film Academy since 2017. Like a number of other Ukrainian artists, Er Gorbach wrote an open letter in March 2022 after the Russian invasion of Ukraine, calling for a halt to the war.

Filmography

References 

Living people
Ukrainian women film directors
Ukrainian screenwriters
Sundance Film Festival award winners
Ukrainian film directors
1981 births